James Ferguson was a Scottish football player, who played for Cowdenbeath and Dumbarton during the 1900s and 1910s.

References 

Scottish footballers
Dumbarton F.C. players
Cowdenbeath F.C. players
Scottish Football League players
Year of birth missing
Year of death missing
Association footballers not categorized by position